Ri is a commune in the Orne department in north-western France.

Saint John Eudes, the forerunner of the devotion to Sacred Heart, was born here.

See also
 Communes of the Orne department

References

Communes of Orne